Millu Jaqhi (Aymara millu a kind of salpeter, jaqhi precipice, cliff, "salpeter cliff", also spelled Millu Jakke) is a  mountain in the Bolivian Andes. It is located in the La Paz Department, Aroma Province, Sica Sica Municipality.

The Qullpa Jawira ("salpeter river",  Khollpa Jahuira) originates south of Millu Jaqhi. It flows to the north.

References 

Mountains of La Paz Department (Bolivia)